Homebrewing mainly refers to small-scale, non-commercial manufacture of a drink, typically beer.

Homebrew or home brew may also refer to:

Computing
 Homebrew Computer Club
 Homebrew (package manager), for macOS and Linux
 Homebrew (video games), software written by hobbyists for proprietary game consoles
 Atari 2600 homebrew
 PlayStation Portable homebrew
 PlayStation 3 homebrew

Music and media
 Homebrew (Neneh Cherry album)
 Homebrew (Steve Howe album), 1996
 Homebrew, song by the band 311 from their album Grassroots (album)
 Homebrew, album by Paul Lansky
Home Brew (band) (also known as Home Brew Crew), a New Zealand hip hop group
Home Brew (album), the first studio album by the group
"Home Brew" (The Green Green Grass), an episode from the sitcom

Other
 A roleplaying game played using house rules, or devised entirely by its participants
 Amateur radio homebrew